William Bertrand (9 November 1881, Marennes, Charente-Maritime – 7 December 1961, Le Coudray-Macouard) was a French politician.

External links
http://www.assemblee-nationale.fr/sycomore/fiche.asp?num_dept=748
http://www.senat.fr/senateur-3eme-republique/bertrand_williams0414r3.html

1881 births
1961 deaths
French Naval Ministers
Senators of Charente-Maritime